The Tyne-class lifeboat was a class of lifeboat that served as a part of the Royal National Lifeboat Institution fleet until 2019. They were named after the River Tyne in North East England.

They were designed to be launched from slipways or operate in shallow waters where hitting the bottom is a concern. The class was introduced in 1982, and the last boat was built in 1990.

The Tyne class was superseded by the Tamar-class lifeboat, which is 7 knots faster than the Tyne class. However, only 27 Tamars were built, compared to 40 Tynes, leaving the remaining Tynes on station to be replaced with the latest Shannon-class boats.

History
The two prototype boats were built in 1982: 47-001 City of London (ON 1074) and 47-002 Sam and Joan Woods (ON 1075).

Eventually forty boats were built. The RNLI had retired the first of the class in 2006 although eight of the earliest boats were sold to China for further duties in 2007 and 2008. Selsey received a new Shannon-class boat in 2017 after almost 34 years' service by Tyne-class boats, the longest of any station.

The last Tyne class boat in RNLI service was at Wicklow and this was withdrawn on 4 April 2019.

Design
The unusual design of this lifeboat derives from the requirement to deploy from slipway stations built for previous generations of lifeboats, with limited clearance. The Tyne also lies afloat at stations where the approaches, or operating areas, are particularly shallow. As the lifeboat's propellers are protected by heavy bilge keels, she is particularly well suited to operate where there is a danger of hitting the bottom, or tapping as it is known colloquially. The Tyne has a steel hull and aluminium superstructure. 
The first two were powered by General Motors 8V-71 diesels of 425 bhp, but the production boats switched to the newer GM 6V-92 of the same power. In the 1990s some boats were re-engined with Detroit Diesel 92 DDEC six-cylinder engines of 565 bhp. During the course of production the weight of the boats increased by over 1 ton; this required an increase in superstructure volume to preserve the self-righting capability, resulting in the height of the aft cabin being raised. Later, further doubts about the self-righting capability resulted in air bags being added to the aft cabin roof.

Fleet

References

External links 

RNLI fleet:Tyne

 
Vehicles introduced in 1982
1982 establishments in England